L. juncea may refer to:

 Lechenaultia juncea, a plant with monosymmetric leaves
 Lespedeza juncea, a bush clover
 Libellula juncea, a hawker dragonfly
 Lomandra juncea, a perennial herb
 Lygodesmia juncea, a plant with fascicled stems